Lance! is a daily sports newspaper in Brazil, and its first edition was published in 1997. Its headquarters are located in Rio de Janeiro, and they print regional versions for some of the other Brazilian states.

History
Its tabloid format as well as its news design quickly became a success, and Lance! is also popular among Brazilian TV and radio sports journalists and reporters.

Its 3000th edition was published on January 29, 2006. There are Lance! offices in Rio de Janeiro, São Paulo and Belo Horizonte, and they also publish regional versions in Curitiba and Manaus.

Lance! also issues a weekly magazine called Lance! A+; its first edition was published in 2000.

Trophies
The newspaper awards the winner of the first turn of the Série A with the Troféu Osmar Santos, while the second turn winner is awarded with the Troféu João Saldanha.

References

External links
 Lance! official website

 
Sports mass media in Brazil
Sports newspapers
Daily newspapers published in Brazil
Newspapers established in 1997
Mass media in Rio de Janeiro (city)
1997 establishments in Brazil
Online newspapers with defunct print editions